Chris Brown (born 1989) is an American R&B singer.

Chris Brown or Christopher Brown may also refer to:

Music
 Chris Brown (album), his eponymous 2005 debut album
 Chris Brown (Australian musician), member of Ayers Rock
 Chris Brown (Canadian musician), Canadian singer-songwriter and multi-instrumentalist
 Chris Brown (Christian singer), American Christian singer-songwriter with Elevation Worship
 Chris Brown (composer) (born 1953), American composer, pianist, and electronic musician
 Chris Taylor Brown (born 1981), singer for Trapt
 Brody Brown (born Christopher Steven Brown), American songwriter, producer, and multi-instrumentalist

Sports

Cricket
Chris Brown (cricketer, born 1973), former Cook Islands cricketer
Chris Brown (cricketer, born 1974), English cricketer

Gridiron football
Chris Brown (American football coach) (born 1974), American football coach and former player
Chris Brown (defensive back) (born 1962), American football player
Chris Brown (offensive lineman) (born 1978), former American football offensive lineman
Chris Brown (running back) (born 1981), American football player

Football
Chris Brown (soccer, born 1977), American soccer midfielder/striker
Chris Brown (footballer, born 1971), English-American football defender and manager
Chris Brown (footballer, born 1984), English football striker
Chris Brown (footballer, born 1992), English football defender

Hockey
Chris Brown (field hockey) (born 1960), New Zealand
Chris Brown (ice hockey) (born 1991), American ice hockey player drafted by the Phoenix Coyotes
Christophe Brown (born 1974), Swiss ice hockey player in the Switzerland National League A

Other sports
Chris Brown (sprinter) (born 1978), Bahamian sprinter
Chris Brown (baseball) (1961–2006), American third baseman
Cris Brown (born 1959), Australian freestyle wrestler

Politics
Chris Brown (New Jersey politician) (born 1964), member of the New Jersey General Assembly
Christopher J. Brown (born 1971), member of the New Jersey General Assembly
Chris Brown (California politician) (born 1981), American politician and businessman in the state of California
Chris Brown (Mississippi politician) (born 1971), Republican Mississippi state representative and businessman

Other people 
Christopher Brown (artist), (born 1951), American painter, printmaker, professor
Christopher Brown (author), American science fiction author
Christopher Brown (museum director) (born 1948), director of the Ashmolean Museum
Chris Brown (British Army officer), last General Officer Commanding Northern Ireland
Chris Brown (veterinarian) (born 1978), Australian veterinarian, television personality and author
M. Christopher Brown II, president of Alcorn State University
Chris Brown (dancer) (1896–1956), Native American dancer and costume maker
Christopher Brown (actor), New Zealand actor

See also
Christopher Browne (disambiguation)
Kris Brown (born 1976), American football player
Christy Brown (1932–1981), Irish author, painter and poet
Christina Brown, American journalist

Brown, Chris